Caenoplana coerulea, known as the blue planarian or blue garden flatworm is a  species of land planarian.

Description
This is a long narrow flatworm, which is shiny black or dark brown on the upper surface, and mid-blue underneath (hence the specific epithet and the common name of "blue planarian".) There is a narrow creamy/fawn coloured longitudinal stripe running down the center of the upper surface. Multiple eyespots are present. The head on some individuals has a pinkish appearance. The adult length is 6 to 12 cm.

Range
This flatworm's native range is eastern Australia and New Zealand. This species has however been accidentally introduced to the Balearic Islands, Argentina, Canary Islands, France, and the USA (including California, Florida, Georgia, Texas, South Carolina and Iowa).

Habitat
It is found in moist forest areas, and during drier periods it shelters under rocks, rotting logs and in leaf litter. It is often seen after periods of heavy rain.

Life habits
This planarian is a predator of a variety of invertebrates on the forest floor. It is known to feed on several arthropod groups, such as woodlice, millipedes and earwigs, as well as on land snails.

Gallery
Showing color variation and more detail

References

 http://ctdbase.org/detail.go?type=taxon&acc=69519

Geoplanidae
Platyhelminthes of Australia
Taxa described in 1877